Gottfried Lexer was an Austrian luger who competed in the early 1970s. A natural track luger, he won two medals in the men's singles event at the FIL European Luge Natural Track Championships with a silver in 1971 and a bronze in 1970

References
Natural track European Championships results 1970-2006.

Austrian male lugers
Possibly living people
Year of birth missing